Bogan Gate  is a small village in Parkes Shire of the Central West of New South Wales, Australia. Bogan Gate is derived from the local Aboriginal word meaning "the birthplace of a notable headman of the local tribe".

The village lies in wheat and sheep growing country and is on the Sydney - Broken Hill rail line, and it is the junction for the Bogan Gate–Tottenham Branch line.

Attractions include the annual Bogan Gate Arts Festival and golf tournaments at the local nine-hole Bogan Gate Golf Club.

History

19th century
Explorer John Oxley passed through the area in 1817. An early reference to the name Bogan Gate is in the New South Wales Government Gazette for 19 May 1876. Tenders were called for the conveyance of mail to Bogan Gate in May 1877. Bogan Gate Post Office opened on 15 December 1896.

The arrival of the railway line late in the 19th century transformed Bogan Gate and agriculture in the region. The western line from Sydney reached Parkes and Forbes in 1893. When it reached the Bogan Gate area in 1896, the settlement moved south to relocate near the railway station. Land for the township was surveyed in 1897 and a public school was built the following year. The railway station was at the heart of the community and busiest during the shearing and harvest times.

The railway made it possible to grow commercial wheat crops in the area. Previously the high cost of transport had made the crop uneconomic in western New South Wales. Also significant in expansion of wheat growing in the region was the practice of share farming, introduced into New South Wales from the United States in 1893.

20th century
The town had a spurt of growth in the years immediately after the railway station opened. By 1903, Bogan Gate had a public school with 67 students, a police station, post office, sawmill, general store, butcher, baker, blacksmith and two hotels; the Bogan Gate Hotel (built 1899), which had 17 rooms, and the Railway Hotel.

Bogan Gate had a population of 300 when the Shire of Goobang came into existence in 1906. By the 1920s, there was a general store employing 11 people, stock and station agencies, a bank, a doctor's surgery and another hotel. The Great Depression forced many residents to move in search of work to larger towns and cities.

An explosives testing ground was established near Bogan Gate during World War II. The site was used by the Australian Army and Royal Australian Air Force to store munitions for decades. As of 2014, the former Defence site was leased to several companies.

21st century
Modern Bogan Gate has a public hall, school, police station, churches, hotel/motel/general store garage and a take-away food store.

Recreational facilities include Burrawang Park, a craft shop in the old railway station, a nine-hole golf course and night-lit tennis courts.

A festival, that included a competition to find “Australia’s Biggest Bogan,” was held in the town in July 2019.

Notable residents
 William Keast (1872-1938), politician
 Lu Rees (1901-1983), bookseller and book collector
 Jim Taylor (1920-2005), politician
 Ian Walsh (1933-2013), rugby league player

References

External links 

Parkes Shire's entry on Bogan Gate
The Bogan Gate "Gate"
A bogan gate, a type of gate roughly made from droppers and fencing wire

Gallery

Towns in New South Wales
Towns in the Central West (New South Wales)